Joseph Edward Odom (born December 14, 1979, in Alton, Illinois) is a former NFL linebacker.  He was selected in the sixth round of the 2003 NFL Draft with the 191st overall pick by the Chicago Bears out of Purdue University. On August 23, 2006, Odom was claimed off of waivers by the Buffalo Bills. After suffering a career ending knee injury, he was forced to medically retire after the 2006 season. Joe currently works for the Stephen Gould Corporation out of Tampa, FL. He is married to Aline Odom from Brazil and has three daughters: Stella Odom, Luna Odom, and Beatriz Odom. They currently live on a small farm in Myakka City, FL.

References 

1979 births
Living people
People from Alton, Illinois
American football linebackers
Purdue University alumni
Purdue Boilermakers football players
Chicago Bears players